Grand Theft Auto: Liberty City Stories is a 2005 action-adventure game developed in a collaboration between Rockstar Leeds and Rockstar North, and published by Rockstar Games. The ninth installment in the Grand Theft Auto series, it was initially released as a PlayStation Portable exclusive in October 2005. A port for the PlayStation 2 was later released in June 2006. At the time of release, the recommended retail price of the PS2 port was around half the price of the PSP version, because the PS2 version does not feature the custom soundtrack ripping capability of the PSP version. Ports for iOS, Android and Fire OS devices were also released in December 2015, February 2016, and March 2016, respectively.

The game is the first 3D title in the series to be released for handheld devices, and acts as a prequel to 2001's Grand Theft Auto III, using the same setting of Liberty City (a fictional parody of New York City). The single-player story, set in 1998, follows mobster Toni Cipriani, a character first introduced in Grand Theft Auto III, and his efforts to rise through the ranks of the Leone crime family, while slowly becoming involved in a power struggle among the city's various Mafia organisations. The PSP version of the game also includes a multiplayer mode through a wireless ad hoc network, which allows up to six players to engage in several different game modes.

Liberty City Stories received generally positive reviews from critics, and was a commercial success, selling over 8 million copies as of March 2008 and becoming the best selling PSP game of all time. It was followed in October 2006 by Grand Theft Auto: Vice City Stories, a prequel to 2002's Grand Theft Auto: Vice City.

Gameplay 

Grand Theft Auto: Liberty City Stories is an action-adventure game set in an open world environment and played from a third-person perspective. Liberty City's layout is largely similar to Grand Theft Auto III, but it also incorporates elements found in Grand Theft Auto III'''s successors, such as more indoor environments, clothing changes, and motorcycles. Though flyable aeroplanes and helicopters are available in Vice City and San Andreas, flyable aeroplanes cannot be found in Liberty City Stories while helicopters are only accessible through certain exploits. In keeping with recent Grand Theft Auto games, the player has more flexibility in terms of moving the camera around for viewing surroundings (Grand Theft Auto III is noticeably limited in that respect). In contrast to previous release in the "3D Universe", Grand Theft Auto: San Andreas, the Liberty City Stories protagonist lacks the ability to climb and the ability to swim – contact with deep bodies of water is instantly fatal. The overall game's open world, as it is based upon the original Liberty City layout, is considerably smaller than that of San Andreas.

The PSP version of Liberty City Stories has a multiplayer mode, for up to six players through Wi-Fi ad-hoc mode (same area). The game features seven modes of wireless multiplayer gaming, in which various pedestrian and character models are from the single player mode avatars. These multiplayer modes were removed in the PS2 and mobile versions.

Synopsis
 Setting Liberty City Stories takes place in early 1998 within the fictional Liberty City, and forms part of the "3D Universe" canon of the Grand Theft Auto series. Set three years before the events of Grand Theft Auto III, the game's setting features several areas that are different from the 2001 version of Liberty City, including locations that are being constructed, or facilities and buildings that are demolished by 2001. For instance the Callahan Bridge is unfinished in 1998 so a ferry service is the main link between Staunton Island and Portland. Another example is Fort Staunton, initially a "Little Italy" district in the game, until events later in the storyline lead to it being mostly destroyed and becoming a construction site by 2001.

 Characters 
Like previous Grand Theft Auto games, Liberty City Stories features an array of notable actors in its cast. Several characters from Grand Theft Auto III make appearances in the game, receiving notable changes in appearance and lifestyles to reflect who they were in 1998. Although Frank Vincent, Guru, and Sondra James return to reprise their roles as Salvatore Leone, 8-Ball, and Ma Cipriani, respectively, from Grand Theft Auto III (and, in Vincent's case, also Grand Theft Auto: San Andreas), other returning characters from Grand Theft Auto III were voiced by new actors. For instance, Danny Mastrogiorgio replaced Michael Madsen as Toni Cipriani, Fiona Gallagher replaced Debi Mazar as Maria Latore, Peter Appel replaced Robert Loggia as Ray Machowski, and Will Janowitz replaced Kyle MacLachlan as Donald Love.

Plot
In 1998, Leone mobster Antonio "Toni" Cipriani (Danny Mastrogiorgio), forced to live abroad for four years following his murder of a made man, returns home to Liberty City. His boss, Don Salvatore Leone (Frank Vincent), welcomes him back and assigns him to work under another Leone mobster, Vincenzo "Lucky" Cilli (Joe Lo Truglio), who despises Toni, and a former member of the Sindacco family looking to switch allegiances, JD O'Toole (Greg Wilson). At the same time, Toni finds that his mother (Sondra James) disapproves of his low rank in the Leone family, and is forced to stay away from her when she calls a hit on him. After Toni escapes being arrested on a job, he quickly discovers Vincenzo seeks to take his place within the Leone family. Vincenzo later leads Toni into another ambush to be killed, resulting in Toni escaping the trap and killing Vincenzo in revenge. Following Vincezo's death, Salvatore begins to personally assign work to Toni, including looking after his trophy wife Maria (Fiona Gallagher). 

Toni soon uncovers evidence that Sicilian Mafia underboss Massimo Torini (Duccio Faggella) is orchestrating plans for minor gangs to take control of the Leones' territory, whilst they're engaged in a war with the Sindacco and Forelli families. After helping to escort Salvatore downtown as problems arise, Toni earns his trust and becomes a made man within the Leone family, causing his mother to call off the hit on him. Toni soon finds himself entrusted with killing the city's mayor, controlled by the Forellis, and assisting media mogul Donald Love (Will Janowitz) into becoming his replacement. However, Donald goes bankrupt after losing to his rival Miles O'Donovan (John Braden), who promptly has Salvatore arrested on several charges soon after his election. Toni remains loyal to Salvatore, and continues to take jobs from him in prison, including killing Don Paulie Sindacco (Jeff Gurner) as revenge for having Salvatore arrested. Meanwhile, Donald also enlists Toni's help in rebuilding his fortune, and hires him to destroy the Forelli-controlled district of Little Italy in Fort Staunton with explosives, so that Donald's company would receive city funding to redevelop it.

With the Leones now the most powerful and sole-surviving Mafia family in Liberty City following the Sindaccos and the Forellis' defeat, Salvatore finds himself targeted by his rivals, forcing Toni to protect him before his trial. Upon being released on bail, Salvatore quickly deduces that Torini organised the mob war and rigged the mayoral elections. Suspecting Torini will likely kidnap Mayor O'Donovan to prevent him from dropping the charges against Salvatore, he joins Toni to rescue him and Toni proceeds to kill Torini. In return, Salvatore demands that O'Donovan grant his family protection, which he reluctantly accepts to do. Shortly after, Salvatore reveals to Toni that Torini was working for his uncle (Bruce MacVittie), who wanted to weaken his nephew's control over the city as revenge for not paying him tribute. When Salvatore and Toni confront him, Uncle Leone admits defeat and decides to leave for Sicily for good. With his uncle no longer a threat, Salvatore settles in with controlling the city, while Toni is promoted to caporegime as repayment for his assistance.

Development
As stated in an IGN preview, "Rockstar dropped Renderware in favor of a brand new in-house engine to best utilize the resolution, texture density and particle effects of the PSP". Until the release of Liberty City Stories, RenderWare had been the game engine behind every 3D game in the Grand Theft Auto III era. Liberty City Stories used Image Metrics for the game's facial animation.

In April 2013, the game was released on PlayStation 3 via the PlayStation Network using the PlayStation 2 backward compatibility.

An enhanced port of the game, with touchscreen controls, real-time lighting, high-definition textures and draw distance, was released in December 2015 for iOS, February 2016 for Android and March 2016 for Fire OS.

SoundtrackLiberty City Stories features ten radio stations, which consist of a mix of both licensed music and tracks created specifically for the game, and talk radio stations. A feature for the PSP version of the game is the ability to listen to custom soundtracks.

To implement the custom soundtrack feature, Rockstar placed the application called "Rockstar Custom Tracks v1.0" on the official site under the "Downloads" section. This then gave people the chance to use the custom soundtracks feature. The application is based on Exact Audio Copy.

ReceptionGrand Theft Auto: Liberty City Stories received "generally favorable reviews" on both platforms from critics, according to review aggregator website Metacritic.

Sales
In the United States, the PlayStation 2 version of Liberty City Stories had sold 1 million copies by February 2007.  In the United States alone, Liberty City Stories PSP release sold 980,000 copies and earned $48 million by August 2006. During the period between January 2000 and August 2006, it was the 16th highest-selling game launched for the PlayStation Portable in that country. As of 26 March 2008, Liberty City Stories sold 8 million copies according to Take-Two Interactive. The PlayStation Portable version of Liberty City Stories'' received a "Double Platinum" sales award from the Entertainment and Leisure Software Publishers Association (ELSPA), indicating sales of at least 600,000 copies in the United Kingdom. ELSPA gave the game's PlayStation 2 version a "Platinum" certification, for sales of at least 300,000 copies in the region.

Notes

References

External links

 

2005 video games
Action-adventure games
Android (operating system) games
Cultural depictions of the Mafia
Liberty City Stories
Interquel video games
IOS games
Lucid Games games
Multiplayer and single-player video games
Open-world video games
Organized crime video games
PlayStation 2 games
PlayStation Network games
PlayStation Portable games
Rockstar Games games
Take-Two Interactive games
Video game prequels
Video games developed in the United Kingdom
Video games produced by Leslie Benzies
Video games set in 1998
Video games set in the United States
Video games set on fictional islands
Video games with custom soundtrack support
Video games written by Dan Houser
Works about the Yakuza